Roderick George McLean "The Arrow" Hunter (August 24, 1943 – January 6, 2018) was a Canadian curler and politician. He was the third on the Don Duguid rink that won two World Curling Championships and two Brier Championships. He also won four British Consols Trophies, the men's provincial championship. After his curling career, Hunter moved to Alberta and became town councillor in the town of Viking. In Viking, he was also the president and manager of the Viking Curling Club.

Hunter was inducted into the Canadian Curling Hall of Fame in 1974 and was also a member of the Manitoba Curling Hall of Fame and Manitoba Sports Hall of Fame.  He died in 2018 in Viking, Alberta.

References

External links

 Roderick Hunter – Curling Canada Stats Archive
 Video:  (channel "Curling Canada")

1943 births
2018 deaths
Curlers from Manitoba
Brier champions
World curling champions
Canadian male curlers
Alberta municipal councillors
Canadian sportsperson-politicians